Henry Anthony Ingles (1840–1892) was a 19th-century Member of Parliament from Canterbury, New Zealand.

References

1840 births
1892 deaths
Members of the New Zealand House of Representatives
New Zealand MPs for South Island electorates
19th-century New Zealand politicians